Sinerpeton is an extinct genus of prehistoric amphibian. It was named by Gao and Shubin in 2001

See also
 Prehistoric amphibian
 List of prehistoric amphibians

References 

Prehistoric salamanders
Fossil taxa described in 2001